Orophia taurina is a species of moth in the family Depressariidae. It was described by Edward Meyrick in 1928, and is known from Sierra Leone.

References

Moths described in 1928
Orophia
Moths of Africa